Eastern Province Command was a command of the South African Army.

History

Origin

Under the Union Defence Force
In 1939, South Africa was originally divided under the Union Defence Force into 9 military districts. At the time, the command was headquartered at East London and comprised 2nd Infantry Brigade and 5 and 6 Batteries of the Permanent Garrison Artillery.

Districts to Commands
Under the SADF, Northern Transvaal Command was originally split into an eastern and western sector while Northern Cape had to be created from scratch. The Southern Cape Command was merged with Western Cape. The Officers commanding the new Commands were usually Brigadiers all units in those areas fell under them as far as training, housing, administration, discipline and counter insurgency was concerned.

Operations
In 1980, Eastern Province Command and 6 SAI engaged in Operation Rain, which was support to the Transkei during a regional drought that lasted until 1981.

In the early 1980s the command's units were reported to include 6 South African Infantry Battalion (Grahamstown), 84 Technical Stores Depot (Grahamstown); 11 Commando (Kimberley); East Cape Province Commando (Kimberley); Port Elizabeth Commando (Kimberley); and the Danie Theron Combat School (Kimberley).

Under the SANDF
Before the reintegration of the Transkei Defence Force, a number of senior Transkei officers had undergone staff courses in India. These included the head of the Transkei Defence Force, Brigadier T.T. Matanzima, who later on became head of the Eastern Province Command.

The command was redesignated as Army Support Base Eastern Cape (ASB EC), currently commanded by Colonel N.A. Ndou. The Support Base was established in April 2000, after the closing down of the Eastern Province Command.

Groups and Commando Units

Group 6 (Port Elizabeth) 
 De Mist Commando (Uitenhage)
 Donkin Commando
 Humansdorp Commando
 Kirkwood Commando
 Port Elizabeth Commando
 Recife Commando
 Uitenhage Commando

Group 7 (Grahamstown) 
 Cradock Commando
 Katberg Commando
 Murraydeen Commando
 Somerset East Commando
 Stormberg Commando

Group 8 (East London) 
 Cately Commando
 East London Commando

Group 32 (Graaff-Reinet) 
 Amatola Commando
 Graaff-Reinet Commando

Group 39 (Queenstown) 
 Aliwal North Commando
 Barkly East Commando
 Queenstown Commando

Leadership

See also 
South African Army Order of Battle 1940

References

Commands of the South African Army
Military units and formations disestablished in 2000
Disbanded military units and formations in Port Elizabeth